Philodoria splendida is a moth of the family Gracillariidae. It was first described by Lord Walsingham in 1907. It is endemic to the Hawaiian islands of Kauai, Oahu, Molokai, Lanai and Hawaii.

The larvae feed on Metrosideros species, including M. polymorpha. They mine the leaves of their host plant. The larvae emerge from the mine to form an oval cocoon, which is made on the surface of the mine, the dead epidermis being cut around a little distance from the cocoon so that it readily falls away carrying the cocoon with it. The silk of the cocoon is light brownish resembling the dead epidermis of the mined leaf.

External links

Philodoria
Endemic moths of Hawaii
Taxa named by Thomas de Grey, 6th Baron Walsingham
Moths described in 1907